A choke ring antenna is a particular form of omnidirectional antenna for use at high frequencies (VHF & UHF). It consists of a number of concentric conductive cylinders around a central antenna.

Due to its intricate construction, it is often enclosed in a protective cover or radome when placed outside and exposed to the elements.

Benefits
Choke ring antennas are notable for their ability to reject multipath signals from a source. Since the path that a signal takes from a transmitter to receiver can be used to measure the distance between the two, this makes it highly suited for GPS and radar applications. In a GPS ground-based receiver, a choke ring antenna can provide millimeter precision measurements for use in surveying and geological measurements.

The choke ring design was originally developed at the Jet Propulsion Laboratory.

See also 
 Trimble Inc. - one manufacturer of this product.
 Patch antenna - another antenna for GPS applications.
 Magellan Navigation - another manufacturer of this product.

Notes

External links
  - Basic choke Ring theory of operation.

Radio frequency antenna types
Antennas (radio)